Astragalus masenderanus is a species of milkvetch in the family Fabaceae.

References

masenderanus
Taxa named by Alexander von Bunge